Callaway High School is a public high school located in Jackson, Mississippi, United States. The principal of Callaway High School is Shemeka Sutton-McClung.

Built in 1966 on approximately twenty acres in North Jackson, Callaway was named after former educator and community activist Robert M. Callaway. Students in grades nine through twelve are enrolled.

The mascot of Callaway is the Charger.

Demographics
There were a total of 1211 students enrolled in Callaway High during the 2006–07 school year. The gender makeup of the district was 51% female and 49% male. The racial makeup of the school was 100% African American.

History
Callaway High School, named after former educator Robert M. Callaway, was built in 1966. Robert, a Lafayette County native,  began his career teaching Choctaw Indians in the mountains of McCurtain County, Oklahoma. Before assuming duties as principal of Liberty Grove School, later H.V. Watkins Elementary in Jackson, he taught at Darling in Quitman County and Pocahontas in Hinds County. He was principal at Watkins from 1936 to 1956.  The Mississippi Children's Choir recorded "A New Creation" at Callaway in 1994.

Feeder pattern
The following schools feed into Callaway High School.

Middle Schools
Kirksey Middle School
Powell Middle School

Elementary Schools
Green Elementary School
John Hopkins Elementary School
North Jackson Elementary School

Sports

Callaway boys basketball team is in Division 5A and is coached by Wayne Brent, former Piney Wood High School head coach, Ole Miss assistant coach, former Provine High School coach, and former NBA Allstar

Coach Brent, in three seasons with the "Mighty Chargers", has won both two state titles and a Grand Slam Challenge title. In the 2008–09 season, Callaway's guards Deville Smith and Julysses Noble led Callaway to a class 4A state title and also won the Grand Slam Title. After the 2008–09 season, the Mississippi High School Activities Association added the 6A division, which in turn took Callaway from 4A to 5A. In the 2009–10 season, after the graduation of Noble to SEC's Arkansas, the Mighty Chargers led by Smith rallied to win the 5A state championship.

1975 Big Eight Conference State title

In the 1975 football season Callaway High School won the Big Eight Conference State title. The 1975 Callaway team was the first Big Eight team in the state of Mississippi to record a 12–0 record, it is also the last team in over 50 years from the Jackson Mississippi metro area to go undefeated and rank as the No.1 team in the state. 
The coach, Charles A. Allman, was chosen Coach of the Year for Metro Jackson three times, and Coach of the Year in 5-A Football for Callaway in 1977 by the MAC. His teams at Callaway had a 33-game winning streak in the '70s.

Team member Tyrone Keys (All-American Mississippi State, and player on the 1985 Super Bowl Champion, Chicago Bears) once stated that the entire defense on the 1975 Callaway defense could have played in the SEC. The offense was also one of the tops in the state that year and produced several players that received football scholarships.

A book has been written by team member Jerome Gentry to discuss the 1975 team and that time period at Callaway. The book, Mississippi’s Uncovered Glory, tells the story about the unity of black and white team members working together to create a powerful bond of achievement. The team included Roy Coleman the first black quarterback to play at Ole Miss, but he was far from the only star on the team as several players went on to have success in both college and the NFL.

Mississippi’s Uncovered Glory also sheds light on how black families lived in Mississippi during the late 1960s and early 1970s and dispels some of the negative perceptions of growing up in Jackson at that time.

Notable alumni
Tyrone Keys, former professional American football player 
Charles Thomas, (born 1986), basketball player for Maccabi Rishon LeZion of the Israeli Basketball Premier League
Malik Newman, 2015 McDonald's All American, Played for Mississippi State, currently in the Israeli Basketball Premier League
Jimmy Smith, (football, born 1969) Wide receiver for Jackson State University and the Jacksonville Jaguars. Top 25 All-Time receiving yards and receptions

References

External links
 

Public high schools in Mississippi
Schools in Jackson, Mississippi